Hadhramaut (Hadramautic: 𐩢𐩳𐩧𐩣𐩩, Ḥḍrmt) is a region in South Arabia, comprising eastern Yemen, parts of western Oman and southern Saudi Arabia. The name is of ancient origin, and is retained in the name of the Yemeni Governorate of Hadhramaut. The people of Hadhramaut are called Hadhrami. They formerly spoke Hadramautic, an old South Arabian language, but they now predominantly speak Hadhrami Arabic, which has much influence from Hadramautic.

Etymology

The origin of the name of Ḥaḍramawt is not exactly known, and there are numerous competing hypotheses about its meaning. One explanation is that this is a nickname of 'Amar ibn Qaḥṭān, a legendary invader of the region, whose battles always left many dead. Another theory is that after the destruction of Thamūd, the Islamic prophet Ṣāliḥ moved with about 4,000 of his followers to this region and died here, thus lending the region its morbid name "death has come." A third related etymology posits that  refers to the inhabitants of the area, themselves, and hints that the way of life of the ancient Hadhrami people was severe and ascetic in the eyes of the bordering kingdoms situated in today's North Yemen.

Ḥaḍramawt has also been identified with Biblical Hazarmaveth (Genesis 10:26 and 1 Chronicles 1:20). There, it is the name of a son of Joktan (who is identified with Qahtan in Islamic tradition), the purported ancestor of the South Arabian kingdoms. According to various Bible dictionaries, the name "Hazarmaveth" means "court of death," reflecting a meaning similar to the Arabic folk etymologies.

Scholarly theories of the name's origin are somewhat more varied, but none have gained general acceptance. Juris Zarins, rediscoverer of the city claimed to be the ancient Incense Route trade capital Ubar in Oman, suggested that the name may come from the Greek word  , i.e. enclosed (and often fortified) watering stations in wadis. In a Nova interview, he described Ubar as:

Though it accurately describes the configuration of settlements in the pre-7th century Wadi Ḥaḍramawt, this explanation for the name is anachronistic and has gained no wider scholarly acceptance. Already in the period before the advent of Islam in the 7th century CE, variations of the name are attested as early as the middle of the First Millennium BC. The names ḥḍrmt (𐩢𐩳𐩧𐩣𐩩) and ḥḍrmwt (𐩢𐩳𐩧𐩣𐩥𐩩) are found in texts of the Old South Arabian languages (Ḥaḍramitic, Minaic, Qatabanic, and Sabaean), though the second form is not found in any known Ḥaḍramitic inscriptions. In either form, the word itself can be a toponym, a tribal name, or the name of the kingdom of Ḥaḍramawt. In the late fourth or early third century BC, Theophrastus gives the name Άδρραμύτα, a direct transcription of the Semitic name into Greek.

As Southern Arabia is the homeland of the South Semitic language subfamily, a Semitic origin for the name is highly likely. Kamal Salibi proposed an alternative etymology for the name which argues that the diphthong "aw" in the name is an incorrect vocalization. He notes that "-ūt" is a frequent ending for place names in the Ḥaḍramawt, and given that "Ḥaḍramūt" is the colloquial pronunciation of the name, and apparently also its ancient pronunciation, the correct reading of the name should be "place of ḥḍrm." He proposes, then, that the name means "the green place," which is apt for its well-watered wadis whose lushness contrasts with the surrounding high desert plateau.

Geography and geology

Narrowly, Hadhramaut refers to the historical Qu'aiti and Kathiri sultanates , which were in the Aden Protectorate overseen by the British Resident at Aden until their abolition upon the independence of South Yemen in 1967. The current governorate of Hadhramaut roughly incorporates the former territory of the two sultanates It consists of a narrow, arid coastal plain bounded by the steep escarpment of a broad plateau (averaging ), with a very sparse network of deeply sunk wadis (seasonal watercourses). The undefined northern edge of Hadhramaut slopes down to the desert Empty Quarter. Where the Hadhramaut Plateau or Highlands meets the Gulf of Aden in the Arabian Sea, elevation abruptly decreases.

In a wider sense, Hadhramaut includes the territory of Mahra to the east all the way to the contemporary border with Oman. This encompasses the current governorates of Hadramaut and Mahra in their entirety as well as parts of the Shabwah Governorate.

The Hadhramis live in densely built towns centered on traditional watering stations along the wadis. Hadhramis harvest crops of wheat and millet, tend date palm and coconut groves, and grow some coffee. On the plateau, Bedouins tend sheep and goats. Society is still highly tribal, with the old Seyyid aristocracy, descended from the Islamic prophet Muhammad, traditionally educated, strict in their Islamic observance, and highly respected in religious and secular affairs.

Mountains

The Hadhramaut Mountains also known as the "Mahrat Mountains", are a mountain range in Yemen. They are contiguous with the Omani Dhofar Mountains to the northeast, and James Canton considered Aden in the southwest to be in the mountains' recesses.

History

Ancient

The Hadhrami are referred to as Chatramotitai in ancient Greek texts. Hadhramautic texts come later than Sabaean ones, and some Sabaean texts from Hadhramaut are known. Greek, Latin, Sabaean and Hadhramautic texts preserve the names of a large number of kings of Hadhramaut, but there is as yet no definitive chronology of their reigns. Their capital was Shabwa in the northwest corner of the kingdom, along the Incense Route. Eratosthenes called it a metropolis. It was an important cult centre as well. At first the religion was South Arabian polytheism, distinguished by the worship of the Babylonian moon god Sin. By the sixth century the monotheistic cult of Raḥmān was followed in the local temple.

The political history of Hadhramaut is not easy to piece together. Numerous wars involving Hadhramaut are referenced in Sabaean texts. From their own inscriptions, the Hadhrami are known to have fortified Libna (modern-day ) against Himyar and to have fortified Mwyt (Ḥiṣn al-Ghurāb) against the Aksumites in the period following the death of Dhū Nuwās (525/7). The kingdom ceased to exist by the end of the third century AD, having been annexed by the Himyarite Kingdom. Hadhramaut continued to be used in the full titulature of the kings of Sabaʾ and Dhu Raydān (Himyar).

Early Islamic authors believed the nomadic Kinda tribe that founded a kingdom in central Arabia were originally from Hadhramaut, although distinct from the settled Hadhrami population.

Miqdad ibn Aswad al-Bahrani, a companion of the Islamic prophet Muhammad, was reportedly from Hadhramaut. A number of prophets before them are believed to have dwelt here, including Houd of ʿAad. He is thought to be buried at Qabr Hud, which is also called Shiʿb Hud, but this is not universally accepted.

Modern

 
The Qu'aiti sultans ruled the vast majority of Hadramaut, under a loose British protectorate, the Aden Protectorate, from 1882 to 1967, when the Hadhramaut was annexed by South Yemen. The Qu'aiti dynasty was founded by 'Umar bin Awadh al-Qu’aiti, a Yafa’i tribesman whose wealth and influence as hereditary Jemadar of the Nizam of Hyderabad's armed forces enabled him to establish the Qu'aiti dynasty in the latter half of the 19th century, winning British recognition of his paramount status in the region, in 1882. The British Government and the traditional and scholarly sultan Ali bin Salah signed a treaty in 1937 appointing the British government as "advisors" in Hadhramaut. The British exiled him to Aden in 1945, but the Protectorate lasted until 1967.

In 1967, the former British Colony of Aden and the former Aden Protectorate including Hadramaut became an independent Communist state, the People's Republic of South Yemen, later the People's Democratic Republic of Yemen. South Yemen was united with North Yemen in 1990 as the Republic of Yemen. See History of Yemen for recent history.

The capital and largest city of Hadhramaut is the port Mukalla. Mukalla had a 1994 population of 122,400 and a 2003 population of 174,700, while the port city of Ash Shihr has grown from 48,600 to 69,400 in the same time. One of the more historically important cities in the region is Tarim. An important locus of Islamic learning, it is estimated to contain the highest concentration of descendants of the Prophet Muhammad anywhere in the world.

Exploration
Among Western explorers, British travellers Theodore and Mabel Bent ventured into the region on multiple occasions in the 1890s. “A few months before the Bents arrived in Southern Arabia, a German scholar, Leo Hirsch, reached Wadi Hadhramaut in search of Himyaritic inscriptions. He was the first European to penetrate so far inland. Although the Bents followed, Mabel could justly claim to be the first European woman to visit the Wadi (preceding Doreen Ingrams who went there in 1934, and Freya Stark in 1935).” The Bents published these explorations in their monograph Southern Arabia (1900).

Economy
Historically, Hadhramaut was known for being a major producer of frankincense, which in the early 20th century was mainly exported to Mumbai. The region has also produced senna and coconut. Currently, Hadhramout produces approximately 260,000 barrels of oil per day; one of the most productive fields is Al Maseelah in the strip (14), which was discovered in 1993. The Yemeni government is keen to develop its oil fields to increase oil production in order to increase national wealth in response to the requirements of economic and social development in the country. Oil contributes 30-40% of the nation's GDP, over 70% of total state revenues, and more than 90% of the value of the country's exports.

Hadhrami diaspora

Since the early 19th century, large-scale Hadhramaut migration has established sizable Hadhrami minorities all around the Indian Ocean, in South Asia, Southeast Asia and East Africa including Hyderabad, Aurangabad, Maharashtrian Konkan, Mangalore, Bhatkal, Gangolli, Malabar, Sylhet, Tanzania, the Malay Archipelago, Sri Lanka, southern Philippines and Singapore. In Hyderabad and Aurangabad, the community is known as Chaush and resides mostly in the neighborhood of Barkas. There are also settlements of Hadhrami in Gujarat, such as in Ahmadabad and Surat.

In older history, several Sultans in the Malay Archipelago, such as the Sultanate of Malacca, Sultanate of Pontianak or Sultanate of Siak Indrapura, were descents of Hadhrami. In the 19th century, Hadhrami businessmen owned many of the maritime armada of barks, brigs, schooners and other ships in the Malay archipelago. In modern times, several Indonesian ministers, including former Foreign Minister Ali Alatas and former Finance Minister Mar'ie Muhammad are of Hadhrami descent, as is the former Prime Minister of East Timor, Mari Alkatiri (2006).

Hadhramis have also settled in large numbers along the East African coast, and two former ministers in Kenya, Shariff Nasser and Najib Balala, are of Hadhrami descent. It has been claimed that genetic evidence links the Lemba people of Zimbabwe and South Africa, to the people of the Hadramaut region. 

Within the Hadramaut region there has been a historical Jewish population.

See also
 Middle East

Explanatory notes

References

External links
 Architecture of Mud: documentary Film about the rapidly disappearing mud brick architecture in the Hadhramaut region
 Nova special on Ubar, illustrating a hydreuma
 Book review of a biography of Qu'aiti sultan Alin din Salah
 Hadhrami migration in the 19th and 20th centuries
 Ba`alawi.com Ba'alawi, the Definitive Resource for Islam and the Alawiyyen Ancestry

Arabian Peninsula
Divided regions
Former British protectorates
Former kingdoms
Geography of Yemen
Gulf of Aden
Hadhramaut Governorate
Historical regions
History of Yemen
South Arabia
South Yemen